Pedda Porla is a small village located in Utkoor Mandal, Makthal Constituency, Narayanpet District, Telangana, India.

Etymology
Its very name derives from village containing big farms (pedda porla).

References

Villages in Narayanpet district